Grateful Dead Download Series: Family Dog at the Great Highway is a live album by the rock band the Grateful Dead. It was released as a digital download on December 6, 2005, along with Grateful Dead Download Series Volume 8. It was recorded on February 4, 1970 at Family Dog at the Great Highway, in San Francisco, California. Three of the songs (tracks 1,4, and 5) were broadcast on an NET television special at the time.

Three bonus tracks also date from 1970 in San Francisco. "Dancing in the Streets" is from October 5, 1970; "Monkey and the Engineer" and "Good Lovin'" are from December 31, 1970 (see The Closing of Winterland for another track from the latter concert).

The album is not to be confused with the similarly titled Family Dog at the Great Highway, San Francisco, CA 4/18/70, recorded the same year at the same venue.

Track listing
 "Hard to Handle" (Redding, Jones, Isbell) – 6:43
 "Black Peter" (Garcia, Hunter) – 9:33
 "Me and My Uncle" (Phillips) – 3:29
 "China Cat Sunflower" > (Garcia, Hunter) – 5:04
 "I Know You Rider" (traditional, arranged by Grateful Dead) – 4:53
 "St. Stephen" > (Garcia, Lesh, Hunter) – 2:18
 "Not Fade Away" > (Petty, Holly) – 6:58
 "St. Stephen" > (Garcia, Lesh, Hunter) – 2:22
 "In the Midnight Hour" (Pickett, Cropper) – 8:16
 "Dancing in the Street" (Gaye, Stevenson, Hunter) – 12:14
 "Monkey and the Engineer" (Fuller) – 2:45
 "Good Lovin' " (Resnick, Clark) – 15:08

Personnel
Grateful Dead
 Jerry Garcia – lead guitar, vocals
 Mickey Hart – drums, percussion
 Bill Kreutzmann – drums 
 Phil Lesh – bass, backing vocals
 Ron "Pigpen" McKernan – organ, percussion, harmonica, vocals
 Bob Weir – rhythm guitar, vocals
Production
Jeffrey Norman – mastering

References

08A
2005 live albums